The Wild Geese Classic was an NCAA-sanctioned American college football game played in Limerick, Ireland.  The game was played on the pitch at Gaelic Grounds in 1991 and 1993.

The Classic was intended to be a celebration of the 300th anniversary of the Flight of the Wild Geese of 1691 and the Irish heroes who resisted an English seize of the City of Limerick.  The game matched NCAA Division I-AA teams Fordham and Holy Cross with Holy Cross winning 24–19.  The game was repeated two years later with the UMass taking on the Rhode Island.  UMass won the matchup by a score of 36–14.

The two Wild Geese Classic games were both hampered by poor attendance, Gaelic Grounds had a capacity at the time of about 50,000 people. The 1991 game saw an attendance of about 12,000 fans and only about 5,000 attended the second. Further, the game was unable to gain a national television contract and was only broadcast locally to areas where the competing Universities were located. These factors led to the Classic being discontinued after the 1993 contest.

Most native fans who attended the Classic were very confused by the rules, having never watched American Football. They incorrectly assumed that the rules were similar to those of rugby and therefore could not figure out why after a pass was ruled incomplete, that the clock was stopped and the play was ended, or how substitutions could be freely made between plays. Subsequently, the loudest cheers during the game were for such meaningless activities like the hang-time on punts, which in rugby are called Garryowens.

Game results

References

Defunct college football bowls
Fordham Rams football
Holy Cross Crusaders football
Rhode Island Rams football
UMass Minutemen football
American football in Ireland
Sport in Limerick (city)
Recurring sporting events established in 1991
Recurring events disestablished in 1993
1991 establishments in Ireland
1993 disestablishments in Ireland